Tigernach, an early Irish personal name, may refer to:

Tigernach of Clones (d. 549), patron saint of Clones
Tigernach mac Fócartai (d. 865), king of Lagore (south Brega)
Tigernach Ua Braín (d. 1088), abbot of Clonmacnoise and Roscommon, putative author of the Annals of Tigernach
Tigernach Ua Máel Eóin (d. 1172), abbot of Clonmacnoise

See also
Annals of Tigernach